Joo Sae-hyuk (born 20 January 1980) is a South Korean table tennis player. As a singles player, he was a silver medalist at the 2003 World Table Tennis Championships, a bronze medalist at the 2011 Table Tennis World Cup, and a bronze medalist at the 2010 and 2014 Asian Games. In the team event, as a member of the South Korean National Team, he was a silver medalist in the 2002, 2006, 2010, and 2014 Asian Games; the 2006 and 2008 World Championships; and the 2012 Summer Olympics.

History
Joo Sae-hyuk was born in Seoul, South Korea on January 20, 1980. He stands 180 cm tall, and weighs 68 kg. He first started competing when he was 8 years old. He joined the national team in 2001, and fans began taking an interest in him for his dynamic defensive style.

Between April and May 2012, Joo Sae-hyuk was diagnosed with Behçet's disease, Although Behcet's disease is known to be incurable, it appears that Joo Sae-hyuk is still performing well. On the medical side, Joo Sae-hyuk relies on glucocorticoids to manage his disease.

Style of Play
Joo Sae-hyuk has helped revive the popularity of the defensive style at the professional level. He is one of the few top-ranked players in the world (position 5 in 2012) to play a primarily defensive style, repeatedly returning the ball with heavy backspin on both wings. This has led many to dub him the best defensive player of all time. At the same time, he has a powerful topspin forehand that he uses to counterattack when the opportunity may arise. As with many defenders, his long rallies and entertaining style of play have made him a fan favourite. He is one of several foreign players in recent years to challenge China's dominance over the sport. Despite his age, he is still going strong on the tour.

Rankings
Since June 2003, the International Table Tennis Federation has consistently ranked Joo Sae-hyuk as one of the 40 best table tennis players in the world after he defeated Ma Lin. Since July 2006, he has been consistently ranked in the ITTF's top 20. His peak rating was at #5, in March 2012.

Coaches
Yang Ki-ho - Personal Coach
Yoo Nam-kyu - National Coach
Kim Taek-soo - National Coach

References

External links

South Korean male table tennis players
1980 births
Living people
Asian Games medalists in table tennis
Olympic table tennis players of South Korea
Table tennis players at the 2004 Summer Olympics
Table tennis players at the 2012 Summer Olympics
Table tennis players at the 2016 Summer Olympics
Olympic silver medalists for South Korea
Olympic medalists in table tennis
Medalists at the 2012 Summer Olympics
Table tennis players at the 2002 Asian Games
Table tennis players at the 2006 Asian Games
Table tennis players at the 2010 Asian Games
Table tennis players at the 2014 Asian Games
Asian Games silver medalists for South Korea
Asian Games bronze medalists for South Korea
Medalists at the 2002 Asian Games
Medalists at the 2006 Asian Games
Medalists at the 2010 Asian Games
Medalists at the 2014 Asian Games
Universiade medalists in table tennis
World Table Tennis Championships medalists
South Korean expatriate sportspeople in China
Universiade silver medalists for South Korea
Expatriate table tennis people in Japan